The Abkhazia Super Cup is one of three professional football competitions held in Abkhazia and organized by the Football Federation of Abkhazia.

Football Club Nart Sukhum won the 2020 Super Cup title by beating the Football Club Gagra team.

List of champions  and runner-up

Club Titles 
9 FC Nart Sukhum
5 FC Gagra
3 FC Afon
1 FC Yertsakhu Ochamchira

References 

Football in Abkhazia